Astara County is in Gilan province, Iran. The capital of the county is the city of Astara. At the 2006 census, the county's population was 79,416 in 20,725 households. The following census in 2011 counted 86,757 people in 25,176 households. At the 2016 census, the county's population was 91,257 in 28,742 households.

Administrative divisions

The population history of Astara County's administrative divisions over three consecutive censuses is shown in the following table. The latest census shows two districts, four rural districts, and two cities.

References

 

Counties of Gilan Province